The 2018–19 season was West Ham Uniteds seventh consecutive campaign in the Premier League since being promoted in the 2011–12 season. It was West Ham's 23rd Premier League campaign overall and their 61st top flight appearance in their 124th year in existence.

Aside of the Premier League, West Ham United participated in the FA Cup and League Cup, entering at the third round in the FA Cup and the second round in the EFL Cup.

First team

Competitions

Friendlies
The club arranged an 11-day pre-season trip to Switzerland, where they played Challenge League side Winterthur. They followed this with a number of other friendlies against English clubs, before travelling to Austria for two games, including the season's Betway Cup fixture, against Mainz 05. In November 2018, the club arranged a friendly against Brentford to coincide with that month's international break.

Premier League

League table

Results summary

Results by matchday

Matches
On 14 June 2018, the Premier League fixtures for the forthcoming season were announced.

FA Cup

The third round draw was made live on the BBC by Ruud Gullit and Paul Ince from Stamford Bridge on 3 December 2018. The fourth round draw was made live on the BBC by Robbie Keane and Carl Ikeme from Molineux on 7 January 2019.

EFL Cup

West Ham United entered the competition in the second round and were drawn away to AFC Wimbledon. It was the first competitive meeting between the clubs since AFC Wimbledon were formed in 2002. The third round draw was made on 30 August 2018 by David Seaman and Joleon Lescott. West Ham were drawn at home against Macclesfield Town, only the third senior meeting between the two teams. The 8–0 win was West Ham's biggest victory for 35 years. The fourth round draw was made live on Quest by Rachel Yankey and Rachel Riley on 29 September. West Ham lost the subsequent fourth round tie 1–3 at home against rivals Tottenham Hotspur.

Transfers

Transfers in

Transfers out

Loans out

Statistics

Appearances and goals
Correct as of match played 12 May 2019

|-
! colspan=14 style=background:#dcdcdc; text-align:center| Goalkeepers

|-
! colspan=14 style=background:#dcdcdc; text-align:center| Defenders

|-
! colspan=14 style=background:#dcdcdc; text-align:center| Midfielders

|-
! colspan=14 style=background:#dcdcdc; text-align:center| Forwards

|-
! colspan=14 style=background:#dcdcdc; text-align:center| Players who left the club permanently or on loan during the season

|-
|}

Goalscorers
Correct as of match played 12 May 2019

References

West Ham United F.C. seasons
West Ham United
West Ham United
West Ham United